Mỏ Cày Bắc is a rural district (huyện) of Bến Tre province in the Mekong Delta of Vietnam. The district is established in March 2009.

Mỏ Cày Bắc borders Mỏ Cày Nam and Giồng Trôm districts to the east, Chợ Lách district to the west, Vĩnh Long province to the south and Châu Thành district and Bến Tre town to the north.

Mỏ Cày Bắc has a population of 138,570 and covers an area of 154.6 km2. The district is subdivided into 13 communes (xã): Thanh Tân, Thạnh Ngãi, Tân Phú Tây, Tân Thành Bình, Thành An, Phước Mỹ Trung, Tân Thanh Tây, Tân Bình, Nhuận Phú Tân, Hòa Lộc, Khánh Thạnh Tân, Hưng Khánh Trung A and Phú Mỹ.

References

Decree No. 08/CP enacted on 9 February 2009 by the Government of Vietnam.

Districts of Bến Tre province